Ice Rain may refer to:

"Ice Rain" (song), 1994
Ice Rain (film), 2004

See also 
 Freezing rain
 Rain and snow mixed
 Ice pellets
 Graupel
 Hail